Robert Michael Guralnick (born 10 July 1950) is an American mathematician known for his work in group theory. He works as a Professor of Mathematics at the University of Southern California.

Guralnick was named a Fellow of the American Mathematical Society in 2012, was an invited lecturer at the International Congress of Mathematicians in 2014, and was awarded the Cole Prize in 2018.  He is currently managing editor of Forum of Mathematics.

References

External links
 

1950 births
Living people
20th-century American mathematicians
Algebraists
University of Southern California faculty
Fellows of the American Mathematical Society
21st-century American mathematicians